Sarvasakshi is a 1978 Indian Marathi-language film directed by Ramdas Phutane with Smita Patil, Anjali Paigankar and Jairam Hardikar in the lead roles. The black-and-white film was a debut feature of Phutane, a former journalist, art teacher, poet and actor, inaugurating New Indian Cinema productions in Marathi. The film deals with the theme of superstitions of the old India colliding with the medical advancements of the modern world.

Plot
Ravi, a progressive schoolteacher in a small village helps fight an epidemic by getting his students inoculated. He incurs the wrath of local witchdoctor in the process. The witchdoctor gets his chance when Rekha, the pregnant wife of Ravi comes to him after the death of their child. He demands a human sacrifice. While Rekha later dies in childbirth, Ravi is accused of superstitious activity and is ostracized by the villagers. He is, eventually cleared, however.

Cast
Smita Patil as Sujatha 
Jairam Hardikar as Ravi 
Anjali Paigankar as Rekha 
Nilu Phule
Shankar Nag
Dilip Kulkarni
Vijay Joshi  Vijay Joshi    
Datta Bhat  
Vilas Rakte  Vilas Rakte    
Ram Nagarkar  
Leela Gandhi  
Kamimi Bhatia

References

External links

Sarvasakshi at Know Your Films

1978 films
Indian black-and-white films
1970s Marathi-language films
Films about superstition